V744 Centauri, is a semi-regular variable pulsating star in the constellation Centaurus. Located 3 degrees north north east of Epsilon Centauri, It ranges from apparent magnitude 5.1 to 6.7 over 90 days. It is unusual in that it is a red star with a high proper motion (greater than 50 milliarcseconds a year).

References

Centaurus (constellation)
M-type giants
Centauri, V744
5134
118787
CD-49 08095
066666
Asymptotic-giant-branch stars